Rovenki is an urban-type settlement in Belgorod Oblast, Russia. It is the administrative center of Rovensky District. Population:

History
The date of foundation Rovenki village is considered to be 1650, which left a nominal decree of Tsar Alexei Mikhailovich, the strengthening of Russia's southern borders. Initially the settlement was called Aspen Rovenёk. This title is retained until at least 1752. In 1669, St. Nicholas Church was founded in the village.

During the peasant uprising led by K. Bulavin, Rovenki been one of the strong points of his supporters. After the uprising settlement the settlement was destroyed on the orders of Peter I. In 1709 he issued a royal decree on resettlement Cossacks Ostrogozhsk regiment of treeless settlements along the river. Since then, the settlement Rovenki began to grow rapidly.

The status of urban-type settlement was granted in 1976.

References

Urban-type settlements in Belgorod Oblast
Populated places in Rovensky District, Belgorod Oblast